The 1991 Winnipeg Blue Bombers finished in 2nd place in the East Division with a 9–9 record. They appeared in the East Final.

Offseason

CFL Draft

Preseason

Regular season

Season standings

Season schedule

Playoffs

East Semi-Final

East Final

Awards and records
CFL's Most Outstanding Defensive Player Award – Greg Battle (LB)

1991 CFL All-Stars
RB – Robert Mimbs, CFL All-Star
OT – Chris Walby, CFL All-Star
LB – Greg Battle, CFL All-Star
CB – Less Browne, CFL All-Star

References

Winnipeg Blue Bombers seasons
Winn